Amber Liarnie Rose Hearn (born 28 November 1984) is a New Zealand association footballer who plays as a forward for Spanish club EDF Logroño and the New Zealand women's national team, making her senior international debut in a 2–0 loss to Australia on 18 February 2004.

Personal life
Hearn is of Māori descent, and affiliates to the Ngāpuhi iwi.

Club career
At club level she has played in England for Arsenal and Doncaster Rovers Belles. The 2009/10 season she played for the Ottawa Fury Women of the USL W-League. She then returned one year to New Zealand where she played for Lynn-Avon United. After that year she announced her transfer to German Bundesliga side FF USV Jena.

In 2003, she was named New Zealand's football player of the year. At the 2010 OFC Women's Championship she won the golden boot with 12 goals.

International career
Hearn was included in the New Zealand squad for the 2008 Summer Olympics, starting in each of New Zealand's group games, scoring a penalty as one of New Zealand's goals in the 2–2 draw with Japan.
Selected for the 2011 FIFA Women's World Cup in Germany, Hearn again scored against Japan, although they ultimately lost the match 2–1. She played the full 90 minutes in each of New Zealand's games, helping secure their first ever point at a Women's world cup in a 2–2 draw with Mexico.

Hearn holds the record for goals scored for the New Zealand women's team in internationals, scoring her 30th international goal against China in June 2012.

She featured in all New Zealand's three matches at the 2015 FIFA Women's World Cup in Canada.

In February 2020, Hearn retired officially from international football, after playing her last match for the national team in June 2018.

International goals

Honours
Individual
 IFFHS OFC Woman Team of the Decade 2011–2020

References

External links

 Profile at NZF
 Team  at FF USV Jena
 

1984 births
Living people
Association footballers from Auckland
New Zealand women's association footballers
Women's association football forwards
Doncaster Rovers Belles L.F.C. players
Arsenal W.F.C. players
FF USV Jena players
New Zealand women's international footballers
Olympic association footballers of New Zealand
Footballers at the 2008 Summer Olympics
Footballers at the 2012 Summer Olympics
Footballers at the 2016 Summer Olympics
2011 FIFA Women's World Cup players
2015 FIFA Women's World Cup players
New Zealand expatriate sportspeople in England
Expatriate women's footballers in England
New Zealand expatriate sportspeople in Germany
Expatriate women's footballers in Germany
New Zealand expatriate sportspeople in Spain
Expatriate women's footballers in Spain
FIFA Century Club
Ngāpuhi people
Ottawa Fury (women) players
Expatriate women's soccer players in Canada
New Zealand expatriate sportspeople in Canada